Tore Bråthen (born September 12, 1954) is a Norwegian jurist, and Professor of Law and Head of Department of Accounting, Auditing and Law at BI Norwegian Business School in Oslo, and Adjunct Professor at the Law Faculty of the University of Tromsø.

Bråthen graduated from the University of Oslo with a cand.jur. degree in 1984, and took the dr.juris. degree in 1998.

In 1998 he became a professor at the BI Norwegian Business School, having been an associate professor at the University of Oslo since 1984. At BI he also heads the Department of Accounting - Auditing and Law. He is also assisting professor at the University of Tromsø.

Selected bibliography
Personklausuler i aksjeselskaper, 1998
Selskapsrett 2006

References

External links 
 BI Norwegian Business School

1954 births
Living people
Norwegian jurists
Norwegian business theorists
University of Oslo alumni
Academic staff of the University of Oslo
Academic staff of BI Norwegian Business School